JTE may refer to:

 JTE Multimedia, a medical journal publishing company
 JTE-907, an anti-inflammatory drug
 Jahn–Teller effect, an effect which leads to spontaneous symmetry-breaking in the structures of molecules